Mazraat el Daher   also spelled Maraat el Dahr,  is a Lebanese village located in the Chouf District of the Mount Lebanon Governorate. The maximum elevation of the village is approximately 750 meters above sea level. The village lies approximately 54 km south of Beirut.

External links
Mazraat ed Dahr, Localiban

References

Populated places in Chouf District